The Sydney hydrofoils were a series of hydrofoils operated by Port Jackson & Manly Steamship Company and its successors on the ferry service from Circular Quay to Manly.

The hydrofoils covered the  journey from Circular Quay to Manly in 15 minutes compared to 35 minutes for conventional ferries.

History
By the mid-1960s, patronage on the Port Jackson & Manly Steamship Company's formerly lucrative Circular Quay to Manly service was declining. The company introduced a hydrofoil service halving the travelling time from 30 to 15 minutes but at a premium fare. 

Introduced in 1965, the first hydrofoil was a 75-seat PT20 from Hitachi, Kanagawa named Manly. Despite early troubles with harbour debris, she proved to be a success and three larger hydrofoils were ordered from Italy through leasing arrangements. 

The first of the three was a 140-seat Rodriguez PT50 hydrofoil, Fairlight, built by Cantiere navale di Ancona, Ancona and entered service in 1966. It would be joined by the Dee Why in 1970 and Curl Curl in 1973. These were joined by the Palm Beach purchased second hand from Macau in 1975 and the Long Reef from Italy in 1978.

In March 1973, Curl Curl was used on a hydrofoil service from Circular Quay to Gladesville, however, the service was short-lived due to river bank damage.

The hydrofoils, along with the conventional Manly ferries, North Head, Baragoola, and South Steyne, were taken over by Brambles when it acquired the Port Jackson company. The hydrofoils were profitable for Brambles as they were leased rather than owned outright. In 1974, the NSW State Government's Public Transport Commission took over the Manly ferry and hydrofoil services, and the hydrofoils were purchased from a finance company in 1975.
 
In 1984/85, two 235-seat hydrofoils, Manly IV and Sydney entered service. The State Transit Authority replaced its remaining hydrofoils with three JetCats, with the last operating on 18 March 1991. The remaining vessels were sold for further service on the Mediterranean Sea. Fairlight, Dee Why and Palm Beach were scrapped at Homebush Bay in 1988.

Vessels

Trivia
The Fairlight CMI, a pioneering digital synthesizer, was named for the Fairlight II, which, in turn, was named after Fairlight, New South Wales.

References

External links

Ferry transport in Sydney
Hydrofoils
Ships built in Ancona